Black Hills is a rural locality in the local government areas (LGA) of Southern Midlands and Derwent Valley in the Central and South-east LGA regions of Tasmania. The 2016 census recorded a population of 179 for the state suburb of Black Hills.

History 
Black Hills was gazetted as a locality in 1968. It was previously known as Oberlin.

Geography
Many of the boundaries of the locality consist of survey lines.

Road infrastructure 
Route C184 (Black Hills Road) passes through from south-east to south-west.

References

Towns in Tasmania
Localities of Southern Midlands Council
Localities of Derwent Valley Council